Birthright International is an international anti-abortion organization of crisis pregnancy centers. It offers a range of services, to an estimated 10 million women, designed to "help support a woman's desire not to have an abortion," including referrals to legal, medical and psychological services, as well as a range of community support assistance such as financial aid.

The organization, founded in 1968 by Louise Summerhill has its international headquarters in Toronto, Ontario Canada, having originated at Coxwell and Danforth.

Following the death of Summerhill, her three daughters Louise, Mary Berney and Stephanie Fox, as well as her granddaughter Victoria Summerhill Fox have taken major roles in running the organization.

In July 2022, after the Dobbs v. Jackson Women's Health Organization decision was released in the United States, a Birthright CPC in St. Paul, Minnesota was vandalized for the seventh time since 2017. MPR News reported that the abortion-rights group Jane's Revenge had claimed responsibility for similar attacks.

References

External links 

Legal organizations based in Ontario
1968 establishments in Ontario
Crisis pregnancy centers
Legal advocacy organizations based in Canada
Organizations based in Toronto
Anti-abortion organizations in Canada
Abortion-rights violence